De Smet (also spelled Desmet) is an unincorporated census-designated place in the northwestern United States, located on the Coeur d'Alene Reservation in Benewah County, Idaho.

U.S. Route 95 passes nearby and the community is located about a mile (1.6 km) south of Tensed, which was originally also to be titled Desmet before the name was ordered to be reversed and was subsequently misspelled by the post office. Latah Creek flows between the two communities. De Smet has a post office with a ZIP code of 83824.

History
De Smet was named for the Belgian Catholic priest Pierre De Smet, a 19th-century Jesuit missionary. He worked with the Coeur d'Alène and other native peoples of western North America for most of his life, periodically returning to his chapter based in St. Louis, Missouri.

De Smet's population was estimated at 200 in 1909, and was 100 in 1960.

Demographics

Climate
This region has warm (but not hot) and dry summers, with no average monthly temperatures above 71.6 °F.  According to the Köppen Climate Classification system, De Smet has a warm-summer Mediterranean climate, abbreviated "Csb" on climate maps.

Education
There is a tribal K-8 school, associated with the Bureau of Indian Education (BIE), Coeur d'Alene Tribal School.

See also
Mary Immaculate School for Native Americans
Tensed, Idaho

References

Census-designated places in Benewah County, Idaho
Census-designated places in Idaho